Michael Bywater (born 11 May 1953) is an English non-fiction writer and broadcaster. He has worked for many London newspapers and periodicals and contributed to the design of computer games.

Biography
Bywater was educated at the independent Nottingham High School and at Corpus Christi College, Cambridge. He was a long-running columnist for The Independent on Sunday and an early futurist for The Observer. He spent ten years on the staff of Punch, where he wrote a regular computer column and the anonymous "Bargepole" column. He wrote regularly for The Times and had been a contributing editor to Cosmopolitan and Woman's Journal. He also writes regularly on high-tech subjects for The Daily Telegraph and a wide variety of technology magazines. He is termed a cultural critic for the New Statesman. In 1998 he was part of BBC Radio 4's five-part political satire programme Cartoons, Lampoons, and Buffoons. He also supervises on the Tragedy paper for a number of Cambridge colleges and in 2006 was Writer-in-Residence at Magdalene College, Cambridge. Bywater was the inspiration for his close friend Douglas Adams's character Dirk Gently.

Bywater was previously identified as a young fogey. In The Young Fogey Handbook (Poole, Dorset: Javelin Books, 1985), author Suzanne Lowry writes: "Michael Bywater, 30-year old Punch columnist and former trendy who once worked in films, made bold to criticise Burberrys for the inferior quality of their product - the trench coats are not what they were in the days of the trenches. Burberrys riposted that indeed they could live up to their past, and made Bywater a coat to the 1915 design devised by Kitchener and Burberry – complete with camel hair lining to protect a gentleman officer's flesh on the field..."

Games, books, music
In the mid-1980s, Bywater co-designed and co-wrote several interactive fiction games. He collaborated with Douglas Adams on Bureaucracy and the never-completed Milliways: The Restaurant At The End Of The Universe for Infocom, and with Anita Sinclair on Jinxter for Magnetic Scrolls. He revisited computer games in the late 1990s as a member of the writing team on another Douglas Adams project, Starship Titanic.

Bywater's book Lost Worlds, on the human tendency to nostalgia, appeared in 2004. His subsequent Big Babies, on the infantilisation of Western culture, was published in November 2006. A book on his journeys round the Australian Outback in a Cessna 172 continues to be a work in progress, due out "soon".

Bywater is a certified pilot and harpsichordist. He has one daughter, Benedicta, who played church organ with Gary Brooker for the "Within Our House" charity concert, also released on CD.

References

External links
Essay taken from Bywater's book, "Big Babies"

1953 births
British writers
Fellows of Magdalene College, Cambridge
Living people
People educated at Nottingham High School